The Lucerne trolleybus system forms part of the public transport network of Lucerne, capital city of the canton of Lucerne, Switzerland.  Opened in 1941, the system had replaced the Lucerne tramway network by 1961.

As of the end of 2013, the system consists of six lines, one of which leads across the city boundary into the neighbouring towns of Emmen, Horw and Kriens. The system is supplemented by various motor bus lines operated by the same transport company.

History
The system's individual trolleybus line sections went into service as follows:

Lines 
The present system is made up of the following lines:

Lines 6 and 8 operate on the same overhead wires between Brüelstrasse and Schönbühl, so that on this section there are trolleybuses at 5-minute intervals during rush hour, and at 7.5-minute intervals at off-peak times. This combined section is described as double-line 6/8.

Fleet

As of 31 December 2013, the VBL trolleybus fleet had 20 rigid, 26 articulated, and three bi-articulated vehicles There were also 16 trailers that can be used in combination with the rigid buses.

In the 2010s, the Lucerne system was one of only two trolleybus systems worldwide, along with the Lausanne trolleybus system, that still operated trolleybuses towing passenger trailers. However, trailer use on the Lucerne system ended on 10 October 2017, following the delivery of more new articulated trolleybuses, and such usage also ended in Lausanne – the last trolleybus system in the world to use trailers – on 4 May 2021.

Type BGT 5-25 originally comprised 20 vehicles, nos. 181–200.

Of the 30 rigid versions of that type, the BT 5-25, to be acquired by the VBL, three vehicles had been retired by 2012: nos. 251, 255 and 256.
In 2014, ten vehicles from that series were sold to the Valparaíso trolleybus system, in Chile: Nos. 265, 266, 268–270, 272, 273, 275, 276, 278.

Depot
The Weinbergli depot is located on the route of lines 6, 7 and 8.

See also

List of trolleybus systems in Switzerland

References

Notes

Further reading

External links

 Trolleybus city: Luzern (Schweiz) (in German) as archived 2021 (information through 2015 only).
 Trolleybus city: Luzern (Schweiz) (in English, but with less information) as archived 2021.

 

Transport in Lucerne
Lucerne
Lucerne
1941 establishments in Switzerland